A tea party is a formal gathering for afternoon tea.

Tea Party may also refer to:

 Tea Party movement, an American political movement launched in 2009
 Tea Party (play), a play written by Harold Pinter, adapted from his own 1963 short story of the same title
 "Tea Party" (song), a song by Estonian recording artist Kerli from the album Almost Alice
 The Tea Party, a Canadian rock band
 The Tea Party (album), a 1991 album by the band

See also
Boston Tea Party (disambiguation)
 Chestertown Tea Party (May 1774)
 Edenton Tea Party (October 25, 1774)
 Philadelphia Tea Party (December 25, 1773)
Tea Party Caucus
Tea Party protests